Tetragonoderus bilunatus is a species of beetle in the family Carabidae. It was described by Johann Christoph Friedrich Klug in 1833.

References

bilunatus
Beetles described in 1833